In Greek mythology, Praxidice (Ancient Greek: Πραξιδίκη) may refer to the following characters:

 Praxidice, goddess of judicial punishment and the exactor of vengeance, which were two closely allied concepts in the classical Greek world-view.
 Praxidice, according to the Orphic hymn to Persephone, an epithet of Persephone: "Praxidike, subterranean queen. The Eumenides' source [mother], fair-haired, whose frame proceeds from Zeus' ineffable and secret seeds." As praxis "practice, application" of dike "justice", she is sometimes identified with Dike, goddess of justice.
 Praxidice, according to Stephanus of Byzantium, a daughter of Ogygus named Praxidike was married to Tremiles (after whom Lycia had been previously named Tremile) and had by him four sons: Tlos, Xanthus, Pinarus and Cragus. Of them Tlos had a Lycian city named Tlos after himself. Cragus may be identical with the figure of the same name mentioned as the husband of Milye, sister of Solymus.

The plural Praxidicae (Praxidikai) refers to the following groups of mythological figures who presided over exacting of justice:

 Arete and Homonoia, daughters of Praxidice and Soter, sisters to Ktesios.
 Alalcomenia, Thelxionoea and Aulis, daughters of the early Boeotian king Ogyges. At Haliartos in Boeotia, Pausanias saw the open-air "sanctuary of the goddesses whom they call Praxidikae. Here the Haliartians swear, but the oath is not one they take lightly". Their images only portrayed their heads, and only heads of animals were sacrificed to them.

Notes

References 

 The Hymns of Orpheus. Translated by Taylor, Thomas (1792). University of Pennsylvania Press, 1999. Online version at the theoi.com
Pausanias, Description of Greece with an English Translation by W.H.S. Jones, Litt.D., and H.A. Ormerod, M.A., in 4 Volumes. Cambridge, MA, Harvard University Press; London, William Heinemann Ltd. 1918. . Online version at the Perseus Digital Library
 Pausanias, Graeciae Descriptio. 3 vols. Leipzig, Teubner. 1903.  Greek text available at the Perseus Digital Library.
 Stephanus of Byzantium, Stephani Byzantii Ethnicorum quae supersunt, edited by August Meineike (1790-1870), published 1849. A few entries from this important ancient handbook of place names have been translated by Brady Kiesling. Online version at the Topos Text Project.
 Suida, Suda Encyclopedia translated by Ross Scaife, David Whitehead, William Hutton, Catharine Roth, Jennifer Benedict, Gregory Hays, Malcolm Heath Sean M. Redmond, Nicholas Fincher, Patrick Rourke, Elizabeth Vandiver, Raphael Finkel, Frederick Williams, Carl Widstrand, Robert Dyer, Joseph L. Rife, Oliver Phillips and many others. Online version at the Topos Text Project.

Justice goddesses
Vengeance goddesses
Greek goddesses
Personifications in Greek mythology
Boeotian characters in Greek mythology
Religion in ancient Boeotia
Epithets of Persephone